Nintendo Mini may refer to:
 Nintendo Mini Classics, a video game series by Nintendo
 NES Classic Edition (known as Nintendo Classic Mini in Europe and Australia), a video game console by Nintendo